{{DISPLAYTITLE:C18H25NO2}}
The molecular formula C18H25NO2 (molar mass: 287.40 g/mol, exact mass: 287.1885 u) may refer to:

 Allylprodine
 Moxazocine (BL-4566)
 RTI-83 ((–)-2β-carbomethoxy-3β-(4-ethylphenyl)tropane)